Hans Fleischmann (11 May 1898 – 28 December 1978) was a German international footballer.

References

1898 births
1978 deaths
Association football defenders
Association football forwards
German footballers
Germany international footballers